The Rocher des Tablettes (1,288 m) is a mountain of the Jura, located west of Rochefort in the canton of Neuchâtel. Its south side consists of steep limestone cliffs overlooking the valley of the Areuse.

References

External links
Rocher des Tablettes on Hikr

Mountains of the Jura
Mountains of the canton of Neuchâtel
Mountains of Switzerland
One-thousanders of Switzerland